| tries = {{#expr:
 + 7 + 4 + 5 + 6 + 7 + 4
 + 10 + 6 + 5 + 7 + 6 + 8
 + 7 + 4 + 5 + 6 + 7 + 4
 + 4 + 12 + 15 + 8 + 2
 + 7 + 3 + 6 + 7 + 6 + 6
 + 7 + 11 + 5 + 7 + 8 + 9
 + 8 + 3 + 7 + 5 + 11 + 11
 + 6 + 9 + 8 + 4 + 6 + 4
 + 7 + 7 + 7 + 2 + 8 + 7
 + 6 + 11 + 6 + 10 + 4 + 5
 + 4 + 6 + 6 + 6 + 6 + 8
 + 11 + 4 + 5 + 10 + 14 + 3
 + 8 + 5 + 6 + 6 + 12 + 5
 + 2 + 3 + 6 + 3 + 4 + 3
 + 9 + 4 + 7 + 8 + 1 
 + 14 + 8 + 11 + 4 + 4 + 7
 + 6
 + 9 + 9 + 6 
 + 2 + 8
 + 11 + 2 + 11 + 5 
 + 1 + 8 + 9 + 6 + 7 + 12
 + 5
 + 10 + 10 + 7 + 9 + 9 + 7
 + 11 + 7 + 9 + 13 + 12 + 9
 + 4 + 9
 + 6 + 9 + 13 + 6 + 8 + 6
}}
| top point scorer   =  Ian Madigan(Bristol)232 points
| top try scorer     =  Luke Morahan(Bristol)17 tries
| prevseason         = 2016–17
| nextseason         = 2018–19
}}
The 2017–18 RFU Championship, known for sponsorship reasons as the Greene King IPA Championship, was the ninth season of the professionalised format of the RFU Championship, the second tier of the English rugby union league system run by the Rugby Football Union. It was contested by eleven English clubs and one from Jersey in the Channel Islands. The competition was sponsored by Greene King for a fifth successive season. The twelve teams in the RFU Championship also competed in the British and Irish Cup, along with clubs from Ireland and Wales.

On 24 March 2018 Rotherham Titans were relegated with 3 games to go, after losing away to Jersey Reds.  Despite seeing some improvements in the second half of the season, the Yorkshire club were easily the weakest side in the division, dropping to 2018–19 National League 1, the lowest level the club have played at for 14 seasons.

On 7 April 2018 Bristol were crowned champions with 2 games to go following title rivals Ealing Trailfinders defeat that day to Doncaster Knights.  They met the minimum criteria and therefore were promoted into Premiership Rugby.  In winning the championship Bristol also became the most decorated tier 2 side in English league history with 4 league titles to-date.

Structure
The Championship's structure has all the teams playing each other on a home and away basis. The play-offs for promotion have been abolished and replaced by the first ranked team being promoted; providing that club's ground fulfills the Rugby Football Union's Minimum Standards Criteria. Under the play-off system some clubs qualified for the play-offs but did not meet the RFU's Minimum Standards Criteria which meant they could not be promoted. The change was made to allow the promoted team additional time to prepare for playing in the English Premiership. As part of an agreement with the RFU, each club will receive £530,000 funding.

Teams
In January 2017, London Welsh was expelled from the RFU Championship and then liquidated due to debt. As a result, Rotherham Titans, who finished bottom of the league, were not relegated; a decision which former Championship club Plymouth Albion contested. Promoted in place of London Welsh were the winners of 2016–17 National League 1, Hartpury College, who have moved from Gloucester 3 North, at the bottom of the English rugby pyramid, to the second tier within thirteen years of their founding. London Irish was promoted as champions and play-off winners of the 2016–17 RFU Championship and were replaced by Bristol following their last place in the 2016–17 English Premiership.

Table

Fixtures
Fixtures for the season were announced by the RFU on 9 June 2017.

Round 1

Round 2

Round 3

Round 4

Round 5

Round 6

Round 7

Round 8

Round 9

Round 10

Round 11

Round 12

Round 13

Round 14

Round 15

Postponed due to waterlogged pitch caused by heavy rain. Game rescheduled to 25 February 2018.

Round 16

Round 15 (rescheduled game)

Game rescheduled from 11 February 2018.

Round 17

Postponed due to bad weather (snow).  Game to be rescheduled for 10 March 2018.

Postponed due to bad weather (snow).  Game to be rescheduled for 10 March 2018.

Postponed due to bad weather (snow).  Game to be rescheduled for 30 March 2018.

Round 17 (rescheduled games)

Game rescheduled from 3 March 2018.

Game rescheduled from 3 March 2018.

Round 18

Postponed due to bad weather (snow).  Game to be rescheduled for 24 April 2018.

Postponed due to bad weather (snow).  Game to be rescheduled for 17 April 2018.

Round 19

Rotherham Titans are relegated.

Round 17 (rescheduled game)

Game rescheduled from 3 March 2018.

Round 20

Bristol are champions following Ealing's defeat to Doncaster on the following day.

Round 21

Round 18 (rescheduled games)

Game rescheduled from 18 March 2018.

Game rescheduled from 18 March 2018.

Round 22

Attendances

Individual statistics
 Note that points scorers includes tries as well as conversions, penalties and drop goals. Appearance figures also include coming on as substitutes (unused substitutes not included).

Top points scorers

Top try scorers

Season records

Team
Largest home win — 60 points
72 - 12 Ealing Trailfinders at home to London Scottish on 24 September 2017
Largest away win — 43 points
60 - 17 Bristol away to Nottingham on 6 April 2018
Most points scored — 72 points
72 - 12 Ealing Trailfinders at home to London Scottish on 24 September 2017
Most tries in a match — 10 (2)
Ealing Trailfinders at home to London Scottish on 24 September 2017
Bristol at home to Doncaster Knights on 13 April 2018
Most conversions in a match — 9
Bristol at home to Doncaster Knights on 13 April 2018
Most penalties in a match — 6
Bristol at home to Yorkshire Carnegie on 23 March 2018
Most drop goals in a match — 2
Nottingham at home to Hartpury College on 29 September 2017

Attendances
Highest — 13,100
Bristol at home to Cornish Pirates on 13 April 2018
Lowest — 426
Hartpury College at home to Nottingham on 10 February 2018
Highest average attendance — 8,487	
Bristol
Lowest average attendance — 814
Ealing Trailfinders

Player
Most points in a match — 25
 Laurence May for Cornish Pirates at home to London Scottish on 25 March 2018
Most tries in a match — 4 (2)
 Max Crumpton for Bristol at home to Richmond on 17 September 2017
 Luke Morahan for Bristol at home to Doncaster Knights on 13 April 2018
Most conversions in a match — 9
 Ian Madigan for Bristol at home to Doncaster Knights on 13 April 2018
Most penalties in a match — 6
 Ian Madigan for Bristol at home to Yorkshire Carnegie on 23 March 2018
Most drop goals in a match — 2
 Tiff Eden for Nottingham at home to Hartpury College on 29 September 2017

Notes

References

 
2
English 2
2017-18